O. elegans may refer to:
 Ochthiphila elegans, a synonym for Chamaemyia elegans a fly found in Europe
 Okenia elegans, a sea slug
 Omobranchus elegans, a combtooth blenny found in the Northwest Pacific Ocean
 Ophisops elegans, the snake-eyed lizard, a lizard found in the Mediterranean region and Central Asia
 Orestias elegans (fish), a species of fish
 Orestias elegans (plant), a species of orchids
 Orthonevra elegans, a hoverfly found in Europe and Asia
 Ouratea elegans, a plant endemic to Jamaica
 Oxyloma elegans, a small land snail found in Europe